Pākiri Regional Park is a regional park located near Pakiri north of Auckland in New Zealand's North Island. It is situated in Rodney in the Auckland Region, and is owned and operated by Auckland Council.

History

The park was purchased by the Auckland Regional Council in 2005.

References 

Rodney Local Board Area
Parks in the Auckland Region
Regional parks of New Zealand